Corey Hollman (born 25 September 2003), is an Australian professional footballer who plays as a midfielder for Sydney FC.

References

External links

Living people
2003 births
Australian soccer players
Association football midfielders
Sydney FC players
A-League Men players
National Premier Leagues players